The Severn Stallions are a United Hockey Union-sanctioned junior ice hockey team from Severn, Ontario, Canada.  They are a member of the Canadian Premier Junior Hockey League and began play in the 2016–17 season. For the team's first three seasons, it was known as the Essa Stallions in Essa, Ontario.

History
On May 4, 2016, proposals were made to Essa Township Council where it was agreed the Essa Stallions would be allowed to play in the fall of 2016 in the Angus Recreation Centre. Their first head coach would be Sylvain Cloutier, a 20-year hockey journeyman who has played in North America and England. Cloutier has coached several teams including the Corpus Christi IceRays (CHL) in 2008–09. The Stallions qualified for 2017 playoffs after their inaugural season. The first round consisted of a two-game series with an aggregate total score to move on. Their opponent, the O-Town Rebels, forfeited the second game and the Stallions played in the four team round-robin where they were eliminated.

The Essa Stallions then won the league championship in 2018 and 2019. After three season in Angus, the team relocated to the Coldwater Community Centre in Severn, Ontario, and was renamed the Severn Stallions.

Season-by-season records

References

External links
Essa Stallions website

Ice hockey teams in Ontario